14 Peaks: Nothing Is Impossible is a 2021 documentary film directed by Torquil Jones, and produced by Noah Media Group, Little Monster Films and Torquil Jones with Nirmal Purja, Jimmy Chin and Elizabeth Vasarhelyi as executive producers. The film follows Nepalese mountaineer Nirmal Purja and his team as they attempt to climb all 14 eight thousander peaks within a record time of under 7 months. (The previous record was over 7 years.)

A significant portion of the footage was taken by the expedition team, while additional images and interviews were added later by the director, including interviews with Reinhold Messner (who called the feat "a unique statement in the history of mountaineering"), and other major high-altitude mountaineers, and Purja's family (including his wife and brothers). The film premiered at the DOC NYC Film Festival, and was released on Netflix on 29 November 2021.

Background

The actual climbing took 6 months and 6 days between April 2019 to October 2019. The first person to climb the 14 eight-thousanders was Italian climber Reinhold Messner who took 16 years between 1970 and 1986 and completed the feat without the use of supplementary oxygen. By 2013, the feat had been achieved in 7 years and 310 days by South Korean climber Kim Chang, who also did not use supplementary oxygen. Purja decided to use oxygen above  for Project Possible based on prior experiences when not using oxygen on past eight-thousander climbs would have stopped him from saving the lives of stricken climbers (something he ended up doing several times during the project). In 2021, when leading a larger all-Nepali team to complete the first winter ascent of K2, Purja did not use oxygen.

Messner appears several times in the film talking about eight-thousanders and what Purja was trying to do; Purja met Messner after suffering a bad fall on Nanga Parbat but Messner gave him encouragement to keep going, with Purja recounting: "He looked into my eyes and said, 'You can do it'. He told me to my face, and he hadn't even seen my climb. When he did the 8000-ers, the whole mountaineering community was against him, but he proved the concept. He did it when the world couldn't see his vision".

Synopsis
The documentary begins in April 2019, with Purja attempting Annapurna, statistically, the most dangerous eight-thousander. Purja joins with Canadian climber Don Bowie who has failed several times on the Annapurna. However, Purja encourages Bowie to come with his team and they are successful summiting on 23 April, with Bowie saying "This guy believed they were gonna do it, and they pushed thru". The following day, Purja returns up the mountain to rescue a stricken climber (later identified as Malaysian climber Wui Kin Chin) which is successful (although Chin would die days later in Singapore). The rescue meant Purja lost his "weather window" for Dhaulagiri, which his team summits in bad weather on 12 May. Purja then summits Kanchenjunga on 15 May in a single 22-hour push passing all camps.

Behind schedule and questioning himself after the deaths on Annapurna and Kanchenjunga, Purja summits the three neighboring eight-thousanders of Everest on 22 May, Lhotse on 22 May, and Makalu on 24 May, in a record 48-hour push, taking a photograph of a large queue that had formed at the Hillary Step on Everest, which went viral and was re-printed on the front of the New York Times.  The film breaks back to the period before the climbing started, with interviews from Purja's wife and brothers about his early life and career in the Gurkas and the Special Boat Squadron (SBS), and the sacrifices and financial risks that Purja took to create Project Possible.  We also learn that his mother is unwell, and of a near-death experience from a sniper bullet to the face while on duty with the SBS.

Purja then moves to the Karakoram eight-thousanders summiting Nanga Parbat on 3 July, but taking a  fall while descending that was only arrested when he managed to grab hold of a random fixed rope that had been left behind.  Purja tells the camera: "I always say to myself, I'm not going to die today. Maybe tomorrow, but not today". He then summits Gasherbrum I on 15 July and Gasherbrum II 18 July. When Purja arrives at K2 (also one of most dangerous eight-thousanders), spirits at Base Camp are very low, and high levels of avalanches meant that most teams are preparing to abandon their climbs.  Purja's team breaks out some bottles and has a party to lift spirits. The next day, Purja and his team begin climbing K2 and lay down fixed ropes in the dangerous Bottleneck section of the climb at 1 am (when the snow is hardest and at its most stable).  Purja summits K2 on 24 July, and over the next two days, 24 other climbers use the fixed ropes laid down by his team to summit the mountain. Two days later, Purja summits Broad Peak on 26 July, thus completing a 23-day push to climb the 5 eight-thousanders in the Karakoram.

Purja rushes back to Kathmandu to be with his mother who has suffered a heart attack.  He then returns to summit Cho Oyu on 23 September, and Manaslu on 27 September.  He then spends a few weeks lobbying Nepali politicians to help him secure a permit from the Chinese to climb Shishapangma in Tibet, which he successfully summits on 29 October 2019. Purja calls his now dying mother from the summit "we did it".  Later we see Purja reunited with his mother and the world's media to celebrate the conclusion of his Project Possible.

Records set
 Fast ascent of all 14 eight-thousanders in 6 months and 6 days (the previous record was 7 years and 310 days by South Korean climber Kim Chang-Ho, who still holds the record for achieving the feat without using supplementary oxygen).
 Fastest ascent of the 5 highest eight-thousanders in 70 days (the record for climbing without supplementary oxygen is 4 years and 219 days by Spanish brothers Alberto Iñurrategi and Felix Iñurrategi).
 Fastest triple-header of Everest, Lhotse and Makalu in 2 days and 30 minutes (Purja was the previous record holder from 2017).

Cast
The documentary features:
 Nirmal Purja (as Nimsdai)
 Suchi Purja (Nirmal Purja's wife)
 Kamal Purja (Nirmal Purja's brother)
 Mingma Gyabu Sherpa, climbing team
 Geljen Sherpa, climbing team
 Lakpa Dendi Sherpa, climbing team 
 Gesman Tamang, climbing team
 Reinhold Messner, climber interviewed about the project
 Jimmy Chin, climber and film maker interviewed about the project
 Klára Poláčková, climber interviewed about the project
 Don Bowie, climber interviewed about the project
 Garrett Madison, climber interviewed about the project

Production 

Purja told Climbing that Project Possible was a way of countering the constant skepticism he encountered before starting, and particularly raising sponsorship for the project, as he struggled to convince investors that his goals were realistic and that he was the climber to achieve them. When he summited the first peak, Annapurna I on 23 April 2019, Purja had only locked down 15 percent of the financing he needed, and most of this money had come from remortgaging his own UK house. However, as the climbing developed, Purja was able to raise funds both through GoFundMe campaigns, and corporate sponsorship (e.g. rebranding the project as Bremont Project Possible).  Purja told Redbull, "It's been one financial risk after the other", and "I always say this project has been 'horrifically amazing'".

During the project, Purja was supported by a rotating team of Nepalese climbers, several of whom are introduced in the film, including Mingma David Sherpa, Geljen Sherpa, Lakpa Dendi Sherpa, and Gesman Tamang, however, only Purja would complete the summit of all 14 eight-thousanders during the film.

14 Peaks: Nothing Is Impossible was compiled from the 100 hours of footage taken by Purja and the Nepalese climbing team from April to October 2019. Director Torquil Jones combined Purja's footage, archive footage, animation, and interviews. British-Indian composer Nainita Desai composed the film's score. 14 Peaks: Nothing Is Impossible is produced by Torquil Jones, and executively produced by Nirmal Purja, Jimmy Chin and Elizabeth Chai Vasarhelyi under the banner of Noah Media Group, Little Monster Films.

Soundtrack

Release 
14 Peaks: Nothing Is Impossible's trailer was released on 2 November 2021. The film was first premiered at the DOC NYC Film Festival. It was released worldwide on 29 November 2021 on Netflix streaming.

Critical response 
On the review aggregator Rotten Tomatoes, the film holds an approval rating of 90% based on 10 reviews. Lisa Kennedy of The New York Times praised the film writing, the film "expands a genre often focused on the feats of individuals to celebrate lessons about vast dreams and communal bonds". The Los Angeles Times's Gary Goldstein noted that 14 Peaks: Nothing Is Impossible is a "uniquely stirring journey". Nell Minow writing for RogerEbert.com gave the film 3 out of 4 stars and penned that  Nirmal Purja and his team "deserve to be as renowned as Sir Edmund Hillary, maybe more". Gary M. Kramer of Salon enthused over the film as it "motivates viewers to get off the couch and go climb a mountain". Pasang Dorjee of The Kathmandu Post said that he was awestruck "by the wonders that lie within your own country is a uniquely mesmerising feeling" and praised Nirmal Purja for his "courage, perseverance, and tenacity". Abhishek Srivastava of The Times of India applauded the film for carrying "a very strong message of teamwork, perseverance, dedication and national pride".

Awards and nominations

See also
Eight-thousander, 
Mountain, 2017 documentary about high altitude mountaineering
Sherpa. 2015 documentary film about sherpa Phurba Tashi and the 2014 Mount Everest ice avalanche
Beyond the Edge, 2013 documentary drama about first ascent of Everest
The Summit, 2012 documentary film about the 2008 K2 disaster

References

External links 
 
 

2021 documentary films
2021 films
Documentary films about climbing
2021 multilingual films
Films about Mount Everest
Films set in Nepal
Films set in the Himalayas
Films set in Pakistan
2020s Nepali-language films
Netflix original documentary films
Mountaineering films
Documentary films about Nepal
2020s English-language films